Gonobombyx is a monotypic moth genus in the family Lasiocampidae. The genus was erected by Per Olof Christopher Aurivillius in 1893. Its single species, Gonobombyx angulata, described by the same author in the same year, is found in Cameroon.

References

Lasiocampidae
Monotypic moth genera